= Solon Williams =

American politician

S. T. Williams

Member of the Washington House of Representatives for the 42nd district
- In office 1895–1899

Personal details
- Born: October 4, 1860 Lawrence, Kansas, United States
- Died: January 3, 1945 (aged 84) Seattle, Washington, United States
- Party: Republican

Solon T. Williams (October 4, 1860 – January 3, 1945) was an American politician in the state of Washington. He served in the Washington House of Representatives from 1895 to 1899.
